Skalzang Kalyan (born 19 August 1989) is an Indian cricketer. He made his Twenty20 debut on 18 January 2021, for Jammu & Kashmir in the 2020–21 Syed Mushtaq Ali Trophy.

References

External links
 

1989 births
Living people
Indian cricketers
Jammu and Kashmir cricketers
Place of birth missing (living people)